Franklin Joseph Tochukwu Onwudiwe (born 23 February 1999) is a Brazilian professional footballer who plays as a defender for Paraná.

Club career
Before the second half of 2018–19, Franklin signed for Croatian side Lokomotiva. Before the 2020 season, he signed for Metta in Latvia. Before the 2021 season, he signed for Lithuanian club Panevėžys. Before the 2022 season, Franklin signed for Paraná in Brazil. On 23 January 2022, he debuted for Paraná during a 1–0 loss to Athletico.

International career
Franklin is eligible to represent the Nigeria national team internationally through his father.

References

External links
 

Living people
1999 births
Brazilian people of Nigerian descent
Brazilian footballers
Footballers from São Paulo
Association football defenders
Campeonato Paranaense players
A Lyga players
Latvian Higher League players
NK Lokomotiva Zagreb players
FK Metta players
FK Panevėžys players
Paraná Clube players
Brazilian expatriate footballers
Brazilian expatriate sportspeople in Croatia
Expatriate footballers in Croatia
Brazilian expatriate sportspeople in Latvia
Expatriate footballers in Latvia
Brazilian expatriate sportspeople in Lithuania
Expatriate footballers in Lithuania